An Open Heart may refer to:

 An Open Heart (book), a 2002 book by the Dalai Lama Tenzin Gyatso and Nicholas Vreeland
 An Open Heart (film), a 2012 French drama film

See also
 Open heart (disambiguation)